Maid, Thief and Guard (/ Cop, Thief and Maid) is a 1958 Italian crime-comedy film directed by Steno.

Plot 
A poor man attempts to break in and steal on the night of New Year's Eve, putting a guard and a maid into trouble. In the end, everything works out for the best.

Cast 

 Gabriella Pallotta as Adalgisa Pellicciotti
 Nino Manfredi as Otello Cucchiaroni
 Fausto Cigliano as Amerigo Zappitelli
 Mario Carotenuto as The "Professor"
 Bice Valori as The Countess
 Luciano Salce as The Count
 Enzo Garinei as The Doctor
 Marco Guglielmi as Franco
 Salvo Libassi as Gioacchino
 Giampiero Littera as Angelino

References

External links
 

1958 films
Italian crime comedy films
1950s crime comedy films
Films directed by Stefano Vanzina
1958 comedy films
1950s Italian films